Eye for an Eye (Spanish: Ojo por ojo), is a Spanish-language telenovela to be produced by the United States-based television network Telemundo and RTI Colombia.  From Gustavo Bolivar, the story is based on Laura Restrepo's novel, "El Leopardo al Sol" while borrowing some elements of William Shakespeare's " Romeo and Juliet ".

Telemundo was expected to air the serial from Monday to Friday over about 20 weeks. As with most of its other soap operas, the network broadcasts English subtitles as closed captions on CC3. However, and after very heavy promotional rotation, Telemundo opted for El Clon on the time slot originally allocated.

Cast

References 

American television series based on telenovelas
Colombian telenovelas
RTI Producciones telenovelas
Telemundo telenovelas